The 2008 United States Senate election in Colorado was held November 4, 2008. The primary elections were held August 12, 2008. Incumbent Republican U.S. Senator Wayne Allard decided to retire instead of seeking a third term. Democratic nominee Mark Udall won the open seat, making this the first time a Democrat won this seat since 1972, and that Democrats held both Senate seats since 1979.

Democratic primary

Candidates 
 Mark Udall, U.S. Representative

Results

Republican primary

Candidates 
 Bob Schaffer, Colorado State Board of Education member, former U.S. Representative and candidate for the U.S. Senate in 2004

Results

General election

Campaign 
The election featured an open contest because incumbent U.S. Senator Wayne Allard declined to seek re-election. He honored his 1996 pledge to serve no more than two terms in the U.S. Senate and announced that he would retire from his service to the US Senate and not seek a 3rd term, leaving Colorado's Class II Senate seat open. Both parties believed this senate contest would be one of the most competitive senate races during the 2008 election.

Predictions

Polling

Results

See also 
 2008 United States Senate elections

References

External links 
 Elections Center from the Colorado Secretary of State
 U.S. Congress candidates for Colorado at Project Vote Smart
 Colorado, U.S. Senate from CQ Politics
 Colorado U.S. Senate from OurCampaigns.com
 
 Campaign contributions from OpenSecrets
 Schaffer (R) vs Udall (D) graph of multiple polls from Pollster.com
 Official campaign websites (Archived)
 Bob Kinsey, Green Party candidate
 Bob Schaffer, Republican candidate
 Mark Udall, Democratic candidate

2008
Colorado
United States Senate